Karin Hardt Meta Therese (28 April 1910 in Altona, Hamburg – 5 March 1992 in Berlin) was a German actress.

Life 

A merchant's daughter, Hardt first took private acting lessons with Alex Otto and received theatrical engagements in Mönchengladbach, Rheydt, and Altenburg. In 1931 she made with Vater geht auf Reisen her film debut and was promoted in the coming years, quickly becoming a popular star. Among her best known films of the 1930s include Ein gewisser Herr Gran (1933), Barcarole (1935), The Roundabouts of Handsome Karl (1938) and Menschen vom Varieté (1939), where she was the naive blonde rival of La Jana. During the war years, the film roles became less frequent. She acted, among other things in Comrades (1941) and Via Mala (1945).

After the war only a few more film appearances followed such as the Queen in Fritz Genschow's fairytale Sleeping Beauty (1955), in addition to Horst Buchholz in Endstation Liebe (1957) and alongside Kirk Douglas in Town Without Pity (1961). Instead, she played mostly on the stage again, in cities including Berlin, Hamburg, Aachen and Cologne. From the 1960s, she increasingly received proposals from television. After appearances on TV shows like Bei uns zu Haus (1963), Der Forellenhof (1965), Die Unternehmungen des Herrn Hans (1976) and as a grandmother in Ein Jahr ohne Sonntag, and movies like Just a Gigolo (1979, directed by David Hemmings), she played from 1985 to 1986 the housekeeper Kati in the successful TV-series The Black Forest Clinic and in 1988 the mother of Robert Liebling in the ARD series Liebling Kreuzberg. In 1991 she stood for Mrs. Harris und der Heiratsschwindler on the side of Inge Meysel one last time before the camera. She also starred in the television series Die Wicherts von nebenan as the Countess of Strelenau.

In 1933, Hardt was married to director Erich Waschneck. Her second, later divorced, marriage was to Rolf von Goth. In 1983 she received an award for outstanding work in many years of German film. Her tomb is located in the cemetery in Wilmersdorf, anonymous burial.

Partial filmography

 Vater geht auf Reisen (1932) - Eva Müller
 Eight Girls in a Boat (1932) - Christa
 Sacred Waters (1932) - Sabine Waldisch
 Die blonde Christl (1933) - Christine Schröder
 Hände aus dem Dunkel (1933) - Cilly Kastor, Stenotypistin
 A Certain Mr. Gran (1933) - Viola Dolleen
 Abel mit der Mundharmonika (1933) - Corinna
 Schön ist es, verliebt zu sein (1934) - Else, Blumenverkäuferin
 Jede Frau hat ein Geheimnis (1934) - Annemie Kolpe
 Between Heaven and Earth (1934) - Christine
 Love and the First Railway (1934) - Brigitte, beider Tochter
 Hermine and the Seven Upright Men (1935) - Hermine, seine Tochter
 Die törichte Jungfrau (1935) - Irmgard, ihre Tochter
 Barcarola (1935)
 If It Were Not for Music (1935) - Thekla, seine Tochter
 Love's Awakening (1936) - Hanni - seine Tochter
 Arzt aus Leidenschaft (1936) - Elisabeth
 Der Abenteurer von Paris (1936) - Mabel
 Port Arthur (1936) - Youki, Boris's wife
 Liebe geht seltsame Wege (1937) - Delia Vigo - ihre Nichte
 Daphne and the Diplomat (1937) - Daphne
 The Roundabouts of Handsome Karl (1938) - Grete Wernicke - Tochter
 The Man Who Couldn't Say No (1938) - Gasperina
 Heiraten - aber wen? (1938) - Ursula Werndorff
 The Woman at the Crossroads (1938) - Elinor Weigand
 Stärker als die Liebe (1938)
 Peter spielt mit dem Feuer (1938) - Charlotte, seine Frau
 Menschen vom Varieté (1939) - Gloria Mc'Lean
 Fasching (1939) - Lisa Petersen
 Dein Leben gehört mir (1939)
 Sommer, Sonne, Erika (1939) - Erika
 Männerwirtschaft (1941) - Ilske Röhling
 Familienanschluß (1941) - Käthe Barkhahn
 Kameraden (1941) - Christine von Krusemarck
 Sein Sohn (1942) - Brigitte, Frau Hellmers Nichte
 Liebe, Leidenschaft und Leid (1943) - Therese
 Schicksal am Strom (1944) - Marianne, seine Tochter
 The Wedding Hotel (1944) - Brigitte Elling, Verkäuferin
 A Man Like Maximilian (1945) - Monika, dessen Frau
 Via Mala (1945) - Silvelie
 Thank You, I'm Fine (1948) - Martina Holk
 Madonna in Chains (1949) - Gerda Wienholt
 Der Dorfmonarch (1950) - Christine
 Vier Treppen rechts (1950) - Marianne Müller
 Island of the Dead (1955) - Erna Kahlmayer
 Lost Child 312 (1955) - Aufseherin im Kinderheim
 Sleeping Beauty (1955) - Königin
 Endstation Liebe (1958) - Frau Lehnhoff
 Town Without Pity (1961) - Frau Steinhof
  (1968, TV Movie) - Hilde Brocksieben
 Just a Gigolo (1978) - Frau Uexkull
 The Black Forest Clinic (1985–1987, TV Series) - Käti
 Liebling Kreuzberg (1988, TV Series) - Mama Elfriede Liebling

References

External links

Karin Hardt at Virtual History

1910 births
1992 deaths
People from Altona, Hamburg
German film actresses
Actresses from Hamburg
German television actresses
20th-century German actresses